Rudik-e Mahmud-e Pain (also Romanized as Rūdīk-e Maḩmūd-e Pā’īn; also known as Rūdīg-e Mollā Maḩmūd) is a village in Negur Rural District, Dashtiari District, Chabahar County, Sistan and Baluchestan Province, Iran. At the 2006 census, its population was 226, in 29 families.

References 

Populated places in Chabahar County